The Gridiron Developmental Football League (GDFL) is a low-level american football minor league based in Memphis, Tennessee, using the franchise model.

, the league has 64 teams. The GDFL plays a playoff format similar to NCAA tournament, as 16 teams make the playoffs (14 automatic division winners qualifiers), with the two finalists meet in the Gridiron Bowl. The league also has an All-Star game called Hype Bowl, where the best players from the Impact Conference meets their counterparts from Xtreme Conference, and played annually before the championship game.

Teams' typical payroll budget changes between franchises, while salary payment also varies per players and per skillset – as some are getting paid, others aren't getting paid at all and some are getting only "gas money". 

History

Origins
The league was first conceived in 2009 and formed in 2010, with Charles Thompson as the founder and first president, and with representatives of several regional semi-pro football teams, that had a plan to form a 32 team pro minor league.

Inaugural Teams 
Memphis Blast, Arkansas Pirates, Carolina Warriors, Mississippi Raiders, Huntsville Hurricanes, Derby City Thunder, Hopkinsville Marauders, River City Raptors, Kentucky Wolverines, Ohio Browns, Columbus Gladiators, Tristate Sharks, Goshen Rampage, North Carolina Bengals, Lumberton Razorbacks, Carolina Cougars, Carolina Lions, Carolina Warhawks, Carolina Warriors, Port City Snipers, Beaufort Broncos, Palmetto Havoc, Palmetto State Spartans, CSRA Cobras, Georgia Crush, Rock Hill Scorpions, Lake Norman Fear, Ashville Grizzlies.

2019–present
In September 2019 the GDFL reached an agreement with Labelle Developmental Football League (formerly Labelle Community Football League) to absorb the league teams under the  Gridiron Developmental Football League umbrella, and to launch "GDFL West Coast". On later date, it was announced that the West Coast Football Alliance teams will become GDFL members, and the Colorado Football Association also confirmed that their league teams are joining the GDFL. On October the league and Developmental Football International (DFI) announced joint-venture agreement, that "would strengthen the American developmental football landscape through stability, commercial growth and the professional development of club football in four main regions throughout the United States", with attempt to mirror the United Soccer League.

As with almost all other sports leagues, the GDFL first postponed and then suspended operations during the COVID-19 pandemic. 

In 2023 the league announced that the Watertown Red & Black - the oldest active football team in the United States - would be joining the league.

Teams

Impact Conference
 Eastern Impact North Division: Huntsville Rockets, Louisville Raiders, Middle Tennessee Bulldawgs, Tri-City Outlaws 
 Eastern Impact South Division: Magnolia State Knights, Memphis Blast, Mississippi Road Warriors, River City Pythons
 Western Impact Conference East Division: Kern Oilers, Mecca Town Dogs, Santa Clarita Valley Tigers, Sin City Rough Riders, SoCal Coyotes, West Coast Lions 
 Western Impact Conference South Division: 805 Bears, Inglewood Blackhawks, Kipsat Bears, North County Zulu, San Diego Silverbacks, Southern California Apaches 
 Western Impact Conference North Division: Alameda County Knights, Bay Delta Nightmare, Golden State Rhinos, South Beach Outlaws
 Western Impact Conference West Division: Central Valley Hurricanes, East Valley Bandits, Elk Grove Kingz, Valley Stallions

Xtreme Conference
 Eastern Xtreme East Division: East Penn Raiders, Western New York/Buffalo Wolverines, NY Falcons, Charlotte (Rochester) Colonials, Syracuse Strong, Upstate Predators (Rochester), Utica Nighthawks, Watertown Red & Black
 Eastern Xtreme North Division: Cleveland Rams, Ohio Elite Outlaws, Ohio Gladiators, Ohio Phoenix
 Eastern Xtreme Northwest Division: Greensburg Golden Hawks, Shenango Valley Truth, Steel City Bobcats, WPA Wildcatz
 Eastern Xtreme South Division: Cleveland Cobras, Cleveland Predators, Columbus Fire, Lake Erie Explosion
 Eastern Xtreme West Division: Charleroi Sabers, Erie Express, Pittsburgh Buccaneers, Pittsburgh Saints
 Western Xtreme Conference North Division: Colorado Knights, Montana Dawgs, Salt Lake City Senate, Wasatch Revolution
 Western Xtreme Conference East Division: Colorado Greyhawks, Denco Spades, Denver Sharks, Loveland Elite, Mile High Sting, Southern Colorado Renegades, Western Dakota War Eagles
 Western Xtreme Conference South Division: Joplin Crusaders, Oklahoma Thunder, Texas Raiders

Notable former teams
 Albany Metro Mallers
 Carolina Warriors
 Central Penn Piranha
 Chambersburg Cardinals
 Dallas Diesel
 Lehigh Valley Storm
 Myrtle Beach Sharks
 Nashville Storm
 Pittsburgh Colts
 Tampa Bay Warriors

GDFL National Champions

GDFL Commissioners
Bo Townsend (2019–present)       
George Burch (2017–2019) 
Devin Richardson (2015–2017)
Steven Roper (2014–2015)
Charles Thompson (2010–2014)

Notable players
       
Delvin Breaux – Former New Orleans Saints player.
Tyron Carrier – Former Montreal Alouettes player.
De'Mon Glanton – Former Arena Football League player.
Kache Palacio – Former Seattle Seahawks player.
Keon Lattimore – Former San Francisco 49ers player.

References

American football leagues in the United States
Sports leagues established in 2010
Professional sports leagues in the United States
2010 establishments in the United States